Jóźwiak  is a Polish-language surname. It is a patronymic surname derived from the given name Józef.

Notable people with this surname include:
 Bogdan Jóźwiak (born 1970), Polish footballer
 Bogna Jóźwiak (born 1983), Polish fencer
 Brian Jozwiak (born 1963), American football player
 Franciszek Jóźwiak (1895–1966), Polish communist politician
 Jakub Jóźwiak, winner of You Can Dance – Po Prostu Tańcz! (season 5)
 Jerzy Jóźwiak (1939–1982), Polish footballer 
 Kamil Jóźwiak (born 1998), Polish footballer
 Łukasz Jóźwiak (born 1985), Polish ice dancer
 Małgorzata Wiese-Jóźwiak (born 1961), Polish chess player
 Marek Jóźwiak (born 1967), Polish footballer
 Valeriya Yuzviak (born 1999), Ukrainian rhythmic gymnast

See also

References

Polish-language surnames
Patronymic surnames